Gustav Ferdinand Hertz (born August 2, 1827, as David Gustav Hertz in Hamburg, died September 8, 1914) was a German lawyer and senator of the Free Imperial City of Hamburg. He was the father of the pioneering physicist Heinrich Hertz.

Hertz converted from Judaism to Lutheranism upon marrying Anna Elisabeth Pfefferkorn, the daughter of a Lutheran minister.

References

German financial businesspeople
1827 births
1914 deaths
19th-century German Jews
German Protestants
Heinrich Hertz